The Purge is an American anthology media franchise centered on a series of dystopian action horror films distributed by Universal Pictures and produced by Blumhouse Productions and Platinum Dunes, which are written and in some cases also directed by James DeMonaco, who was inspired by a Star Trek: The Original Series episode, "The Return of the Archons". The films present a seemingly normal, crime-free America in the near-future. However, the country is a dystopia which observes an annual event known as "the Purge", in which all crime, including murder, is decriminalized for a 12-hour period.

The franchise began in 2013 with The Purge, directed by creator DeMonaco, who also directed two of the sequels and wrote the screenplays for all films in the series. A fifth installment, The Forever Purge, was released on July 2, 2021. In addition to the films, the franchise has spawned a twenty-episode television series which premiered on September 4, 2018, and concluded on December 17, 2019; DeMonaco wrote its pilot episode.

The franchise has received a mixed critical reception, mainly for the screenwriting and clichéd stories, but was praised for the concept, acting, style, and action sequences. The franchise has grossed over $450m overall, against a combined production budget of $53m.

Films

The Purge (2013)

The Purge stars Ethan Hawke, Lena Headey, Max Burkholder, Adelaide Kane, Edwin Hodge, Rhys Wakefield, Tony Oller and Arija Bareikis.

The film depicts a wealthy family who acquired their wealth by selling security systems for use during the annual purge.

Despite mixed reviews, the film grossed $89.3 million during its run, far surpassing its $3 million budget. The film was turned into a scare zone in 2014 for Universal Parks & Resorts annual Halloween Horror Nights due to its success.

The Purge: Anarchy (2014)

The Purge: Anarchy, released worldwide on July 18, 2014, stars Frank Grillo, Carmen Ejogo, Zach Gilford, Kiele Sanchez, Zoë Soul and Michael K. Williams, while Edwin Hodge briefly reprises his role of "The Stranger" from the first movie.

Unlike the first Purge film, which was set entirely in one house during the carnage, Anarchy follows a waitress and her daughter who go out to the Los Angeles area during the annual purge, eventually running into an anti-purge group who offers them some protection.

The film was met with generally mixed reviews, though many critics agreed it was a large improvement over the first film, and was a box office success, grossing $111.9 million compared to its $9 million budget.

The Purge: Election Year (2016)

The third film was released on July 1, 2016. Frank Grillo and Edwin Hodge reprise their roles from the previous film and are joined by Elizabeth Mitchell, who plays Senator Charlie Roan. On October 6, it was announced that James DeMonaco would be back for the third film to write and direct, while producers Sébastien K. Lemercier, Blumhouse Productions' Jason Blum, and Platinum Dunes partners Michael Bay, Brad Fuller, and Andrew Form would also be back. Shooting began on September 16 in Woonsocket, Rhode Island.

The film takes place during a presidential election year in the United States. The election is between a member of the New Founding Fathers against a senator who wants to end the annual purge after losing her family as a teenager in the purge.

The film received mixed reviews from critics and went on to gross over $118 million worldwide against a budget of $10 million, becoming the second highest-grossing film of the series.

The First Purge (2018)

In September 2016, James DeMonaco, who wrote and directed every film in the series thus far, stated that the fourth film would be a prequel to the trilogy. The film shows how the United States got to the point of accepting the Purge.

The film takes place in the New York City borough of Staten Island. As the title suggests, it is about the very first in the United States, which is done as an experiment to combat crime and poverty. The island is completely locked down for those who choose to participate and those who do wear contact lens with a built in camera during the purge and will be paid $5,000 for staying in Staten Island, along with receiving additional money for full participation.

In February 2017, DeMonaco announced that a fourth installment was in development. DeMonaco returned to write the script, while Jason Blum, Michael Bay, Brad Fuller, and Andrew Form returning to produce the film with Sébastien K. Lemercier. In July 2017 it was announced that Derin Jacob was signed to direct the film, and shooting began in September 2017 in Buffalo, New York. The film was released on July 4, 2018, to mixed reviews from critics and went on to gross over $137 million worldwide on a $13 million budget, becoming the highest grossing entry in the franchise.

The Forever Purge (2021)

In October 2018, The Purge creator James DeMonaco stated that the fifth film was set to be the last in the series, stating that "it will be a really cool ending, how we take this one home."

In August 2019, it was announced that Everardo Valerio Gout will direct the film. The film was initially scheduled to be released in the United States on July 10, 2020, by Universal Pictures. In May 2020, the film was delayed indefinitely due to the COVID-19 pandemic. In July 2020, the film was rescheduled for July 9, 2021. In April 2021, it was moved back a week to July 2, 2021.

The film takes place fourteen years after Election Year where the Purge has been reinstated by the re-elected New Founding Fathers of America (NFFA). In response to eight years without a Purge, an anti-immigration hate group known as The Forever After Purge continue to Purge beyond the end of the purge, proceeding to wipe out the government and take over major cities in the country to commence what they call a "purification" of the country, which primarily targets both immigrants and the upper class.

Untitled sixth Purge film
In June 2021, producer Jason Blum stated that he intends to make additional Purge films and that he is working on convincing DeMonaco to continue the story. The producer stated that he would not make more without the filmmaker's collaboration. DeMonaco later stated that up until four months previous he had intended The Forever Purge to be the final film in the franchise. The filmmaker stated that one day he woke up with another idea where he could "flip this thing upside down and we can continue...in a way that people can enjoy." DeMonaco confirmed that he is working on the script, while stating that whether it is made, depends on the reception to the previous film.

In September 2021, in an interview with Nightmare on Film Street, DeMonaco stated that the story for Purge 6 includes Frank Grillo reprising his role as Leo Barnes. The story includes a worldwide Purge, an idea that he had originally intended for a third season of now-cancelled television series. By September, DeMonaco had completed the script and signed on to additionally serve as director; while Grillo officially signed on to reprise his role in the franchise. The film will take place 10 years after The Forever Purge, in 2059, while the portrayal of the dystopian "tribalized" America will be different in this film, referencing Escape from New York as an influence, and following Barnes in the midst of the Second American Civil War as he is sent on a mission through various Purge states.

Television

The Purge (2018–19)

In May 2017, it was reported that Syfy and USA Network would premiere the series in 2018. On February 26, 2018, it was announced that Gabriel Chavarria and Jessica Garza were cast as the leads in the upcoming series. On November 6, 2018, USA Network renewed the show for a second season, which premiered October 15, 2019, with 10 episodes and follows up from the events of the first season. In an interview with Scream, The Purge television series showrunner Thomas Kelly stated that a heist film set on Purge Night has been considered; this plot point was later used in the series' second season. On May 13, 2020, the USA Network canceled the series after two seasons.

Recurring cast and characters

Fictional premise

Origins of the annual purge
In 2014, following an economic collapse and rising social unrest, a political organization named The New Founding Fathers of America (NFFA) is formed and is voted into office. The organization establishes a new totalitarian government and a police state. In 2016, the NFFA devises a plan to help stabilize American society and later in 2017, the 28th Amendment to the U.S Constitution is ratified. This amendment establishes a 12-hour event known as "The Purge" which would take place from 7 PM on March 21 to 7 AM on March 22 wherein all crime becomes legal. Before the Purge begins, the Emergency Broadcast System (the predecessor to the Emergency Alert System, which returned for unexplained reasons) is activated with rules and a prayer saying "Blessed be our New Founding Fathers and America, a nation reborn" before ending with "May God be with you all".

Rules
The rules for the annual Purge are as follows:
 Sirens blare throughout the land to signal the start and end of The Purge.
 All police, fire, and emergency medical services are suspended for the duration of the Purge.
 The president, first family, and government officials of rank 10, are granted immunity from the Purge, meaning that they must not be harmed. (This was revoked in Election Year to permit the murder of a political opponent).
 Only Class 1–4 weaponry is permitted, while Class 5 weaponry (such as explosives) is prohibited.
 Violations of any Purge rules will result in public execution.

Emergency broadcast system message
Below is how the Emergency Broadcast System announces the Purge' commencement in the first two films:

In The Purge: Election Year, the rule granting immunity to ranking 10 officials is revoked by the NFFA in order to assassinate Roan, an anti-Purge Presidential candidate who runs on a platform of overturning the 28th Amendment which, to the NFFA's distress, has achieved parity in the polls with their candidate. This change is reflected in the announcement of the final Purge's commencement as follows:

In The First Purge, taking place in 2016 on Staten Island, New York, which was blocked off from all contact due to the First Purge really being a social experiment conducted by the New Founding Fathers, providing monetary compensation of at least $5,000 to anyone who decides to stay on the island for the night, one year prior to the first nationwide Purge. Below shows the commencement speech as follows:

Impact
Within the film series, the Purge has resulted in crime and unemployment rates plummeting to 1% and a strong economy. Although it's thought to be used as an act of catharsis for the U.S. populace, it's actually used as a method of artificial population control, as the unemployed poor in slum neighborhoods as well as some working-class people are usually the main targets. In Election Year, a character notes that sneaking up on a Black man on Purge night is a particularly foolish action, suggesting that Black people are used to being targets on this night. By this time it has also increased tourism as foreigners enter the US solely to participate in the Purge.

Timeline of events
Below is the fictional timeline played out in the franchise:

 2014: Rising unemployment and a housing crisis leads to the New Founding Fathers of America (NFFA) being elected to become the most powerful political party in the United States.
 2016: NFFA chief of staff Arlo Sabian and sociologist Dr. May Updale announce a controversial social experiment to take place on Staten Island where for 12 consecutive hours, all crime will be legalised, and citizens will be allowed to release their inhibitions in any way they choose, including murder, a practical examination of a thought experiment developed by Updale.
 March 21–22, 2016: The NFFA Social Experiment occurs in the New York City borough of Staten Island as a "NFFA Social Experiment", dubbed "The Purge" by Sabian on suggestion of a crazed drug addict named Skeletor. After the majority of the inhabitants of Staten Island (minus Skeletor) engage in low-level crimes such as peace disturbance (loud parties), disorderly conducts (vandalism, looting, public drug use, public intoxication, and sex acts) and small felonies rather than high-level ones such as murder, Sabian has several masked mercenary groups deployed to kills citizens around Staten Island, masquerading as other citizens. After Updale discovers that the NFFA sabotaged the experiment to eradicate the poor and "minorities" to save the expense of social programs, justifying a national Purge to be implemented the following year, Sabian has her taken to Staten Island and executed. After the NFFA declare the purge a success, President Bracken authorises Annual National Purges.
 March 21–22, 2017: The first national Purge occurs.
 March 21–22, 2022: National acceptance of the Purge; the Sandin family saves the life of homeless man Dante Bishop, while the family patriarch, James Sandin, is killed by the purgers and the Sandin's jealous neighbours. Elsewhere, Charlie Roan's family is killed by another batch of purgers, leaving her as the only survivor.
 March 21–22, 2023: Carmelo Johns forms an anti-NFFA resistance movement with Dante as his partner. Leo Barnes considers murdering the man who accidentally killed his son, but was not arrested due to an error, before changing his mind at the last minute.
 March 21, 2027–March 21, 2028: European countries have some plans of adopting a Purge night of their own in the future after seeing the success of the event in America.
 March 22, 2036–March 22, 2037: Former NFFA surveillance employee Esme Carmona publicly exposes the NFFA's misdeeds before being illegally executed moments after the ending of the Purge.
 March 21–22, 2040: Dante saves the life of independent presidential candidate Charlie Roan, who seeks to end the purge, alongside Barnes, her security chief.
 May 2040: Charlie Roan is elected President of the United States and vows to end the purge, with Barnes serving as her chief of staff and head of the secret service.
 March 21–22, 2041: With the purge outlawed, would-be Purgers are arrested en-masse.
 November 6, 2048: The NFFA are re-elected, who state their intentions to reinstate the purge to resume the following year, citing an increase in crime and immigration as justification.
 March 21–22, 2049: The purge returns after a nine-year absence. After the purge is supposed to end, anti-immigration hate group and NFFA offshoot the Purge Purification Force (PPF) organize a "forever purge" across America. Canada and Mexico open their borders for asylum seekers looking to escape the "forever purge" for six hours, while the NFFA is permanently disbanded. After purgers defeat a military base in El Paso, Mexico closes the border early, leaving many survivors stranded at the border, allowing them to be mercilessly slaughtered by purgers, as a new resistance movement forms against them.
 2059: As the Second American Civil War rages, Leo Barnes embarks on a mission across the remapped Americas' "tribalized" states, where various independent Purges are taking place.

Reception

Box office performance
The Purge is one of the highest grossing horror film franchise of all-time.

Critical and public response

References

External links
 

 
Horror film franchises
Action film franchises
Films about totalitarianism
Battle royale
Fiction about law
Urban survival films
Universal Pictures franchises
Mass media franchises introduced in 2013
2000s English-language films
2010s English-language films
Works by James DeMonaco